The NHL's Central Division was formed in 1993 as part of the Western Conference in a league realignment. Its predecessor was the Norris Division and its also one of two successors to the Northwest Division. The Chicago Blackhawks have been a member of the Central Division in all of its seasons since the original 1993 realignment. The Arizona Coyotes (as the original Winnipeg Jets), Dallas Stars and St. Louis Blues were also original members of the division, but were realigned to a different division for a while before returning; both the Coyotes and Stars were moved to the Pacific Division in 1998 (the Stars moved back to the Central in 2013, and the Coyotes followed in 2021), while the Blues were moved to the West Division during the temporary 2021 realignment. Three of its teams—the Minnesota Wild, Nashville Predators, and Winnipeg Jets (as the Atlanta Thrashers)—joined the NHL in the league's last expansion phase between 1998 and 2000. The fourth team in that group, the Columbus Blue Jackets, was once a member of the Central Division, but moved to the Metropolitan Division after the 2013 realignment. 

After the addition of the Vegas Golden Knights to the Pacific Division in 2017, the Central Division was the only division in the NHL without eight teams. This situation remained in effect until the 2020–21 NHL season, when the COVID-19 pandemic compelled a radical re-alignment of the divisions, including the temporary abolition of the Eastern and Western conferences. The Central Division was the only existing division retained for the 2020–21 NHL season. Only three of the eight Central Division teams for 2020–21 were members of the division in the previous season.

The Central Division has sent five teams to the Stanley Cup playoffs on seven occasions. In the first three seasons after the realignment of 2013, Central Division teams occupied both Wild Card playoff spots in the Western Conference. This occurred again in the 2018–19 season, for the fourth time in six seasons. In the pandemic-shortened 2019–20 season, all Central Division teams made the 2020 Stanley Cup playoffs due to the 24-team format.

Division lineups

1993–1996
 Chicago Blackhawks
 Dallas Stars
 Detroit Red Wings
 St. Louis Blues
 Toronto Maple Leafs
 Winnipeg Jets

Changes from the 1992–93 season
 The Central Division is formed as the result of NHL realignment
 The Minnesota North Stars move to Dallas, Texas, and become the Dallas Stars
 The Chicago Blackhawks, Dallas Stars, Detroit Red Wings, St. Louis Blues, and Toronto Maple Leafs come from the Norris Division
 The Winnipeg Jets come from the Smythe Division

1996–1998
 Chicago Blackhawks
 Dallas Stars
 Detroit Red Wings
 Phoenix Coyotes
 St. Louis Blues
 Toronto Maple Leafs

Changes from the 1995–96 season
 The Winnipeg Jets move to Phoenix, Arizona, to become the Phoenix Coyotes

1998–2000
 Chicago Blackhawks
 Detroit Red Wings
 Nashville Predators
 St. Louis Blues

Changes from the 1997–98 season
 The Dallas Stars and Phoenix Coyotes move to the Pacific Division
 The Toronto Maple Leafs move to the Northeast Division
 The Nashville Predators are added as an expansion team

2000–2013
 Chicago Blackhawks
 Columbus Blue Jackets
 Detroit Red Wings
 Nashville Predators
 St. Louis Blues

Changes from the 1999–2000 season
 The Columbus Blue Jackets are added as an expansion team

2013–2020
 Chicago Blackhawks
 Colorado Avalanche
 Dallas Stars
 Minnesota Wild
 Nashville Predators
 St. Louis Blues
 Winnipeg Jets

Changes from the 2012–13 season
 The Northwest Division is dissolved due to NHL realignment
 The Columbus Blue Jackets move to the Metropolitan Division
 The Detroit Red Wings move to the Atlantic Division
 The Colorado Avalanche and Minnesota Wild come from the Northwest Division
 The Dallas Stars come from the Pacific Division
 The Winnipeg Jets come from the Southeast Division

2020–2021
 Carolina Hurricanes
 Chicago Blackhawks
 Columbus Blue Jackets
 Dallas Stars
 Detroit Red Wings
 Florida Panthers
 Nashville Predators
 Tampa Bay Lightning

Changes from the 2019–20 season
 Due to COVID-19 restrictions the NHL realigned into four divisions with no conferences for the 2020–21 season
 The Colorado Avalanche, Minnesota Wild and St. Louis Blues move to the West Division
 The Winnipeg Jets move to the North Division
 The Carolina Hurricanes and Columbus Blue Jackets come from the Metropolitan Division
 The Detroit Red Wings, Florida Panthers and Tampa Bay Lightning come from the Atlantic Division

2021–present
 Arizona Coyotes
 Chicago Blackhawks
 Colorado Avalanche
 Dallas Stars
 Minnesota Wild
 Nashville Predators
 St. Louis Blues
 Winnipeg Jets

Changes from the 2020–21 season
 The league returned to using a four division and two conference alignment
 The Carolina Hurricanes and Columbus Blue Jackets move to the Metropolitan Division
 The Detroit Red Wings, Florida Panthers and Tampa Bay Lightning move to the Atlantic Division 
 The Arizona Coyotes, Colorado Avalanche, Minnesota Wild and St. Louis Blues come from the West Division
 The Winnipeg Jets come from the North Division

Division champions
 1994 – Detroit Red Wings (46–30–8, 100 pts)
 1995 – Detroit Red Wings (33–11–4, 70 pts)
 1996 – Detroit Red Wings (62–13–7, 131 pts)
 1997 – Dallas Stars (48–26–8, 104 pts)
 1998 – Dallas Stars (49–22–11, 109 pts)
 1999 – Detroit Red Wings (43–32–7, 93 pts)
 2000 – St. Louis Blues (51–19–11–1, 114 pts)
 2001 – Detroit Red Wings (49–20–9–4, 111 pts)
 2002 – Detroit Red Wings (51–17–10–4, 116 pts)
 2003 – Detroit Red Wings (48–20–10–4, 110 pts)
 2004 – Detroit Red Wings (48–21–11–2, 109 pts)
 2005 – no season (NHL Lockout)
 2006 – Detroit Red Wings (58–16–8, 124 pts)
 2007 – Detroit Red Wings (50–19–13, 113 pts)
 2008 – Detroit Red Wings (54–21–7, 115 pts)
 2009 – Detroit Red Wings (51–21–10, 112 pts)
 2010 – Chicago Blackhawks (52–22–8, 112 pts)
 2011 – Detroit Red Wings (47–25–10, 104 pts)
 2012 – St. Louis Blues (49–22–11, 109 pts)
 2013 – Chicago Blackhawks (36–7–5, 77 pts)
 2014 – Colorado Avalanche (52–22–8, 112 pts)
 2015 – St. Louis Blues (51–24–7, 109 pts)
 2016 – Dallas Stars (50–23–9, 109 pts)
 2017 – Chicago Blackhawks (50–23–9, 109 pts)
 2018 – Nashville Predators (53–18–11, 117 pts)
 2019 – Nashville Predators (47–29–6, 100 pts)
 2020 – St. Louis Blues (42–19–10, 94 pts)
 2021 – Carolina Hurricanes (36–12–8, 80 pts)
 2022 – Colorado Avalanche (56–19–7, 119 pts)

Season results

Notes
 The 1994–95 NHL season was shortened to 48 games due to the lockout.
 The 2012–13 NHL season was shortened to 48 games due to the lockout.
 The 2019–20 NHL season was cut short due to the COVID-19 pandemic. Due to the imbalance in the number of games played among teams, the regular season standings were determined by points percentage.
 The 2020–21 NHL season was shortened to 56 games due the COVID-19 pandemic and the Canada-United States border closure.

Stanley Cup winners produced
 1997 – Detroit Red Wings
 1998 – Detroit Red Wings
 2002 – Detroit Red Wings
 2008 – Detroit Red Wings
 2010 – Chicago Blackhawks
 2013 – Chicago Blackhawks
 2015 – Chicago Blackhawks
 2019 – St. Louis Blues
 2021 – Tampa Bay Lightning
 2022 – Colorado Avalanche

Presidents' Trophy winners produced
 1995 – Detroit Red Wings
 1996 – Detroit Red Wings
 1998 – Dallas Stars
 2000 – St. Louis Blues
 2002 – Detroit Red Wings
 2004 – Detroit Red Wings
 2006 – Detroit Red Wings
 2008 – Detroit Red Wings
 2013 – Chicago Blackhawks
 2018 – Nashville Predators

Central Division titles won by team
Teams in bold are currently in the division.

References

NHL History

 
 
National Hockey League divisions
Arizona Coyotes
Chicago Blackhawks
Colorado Avalanche
Dallas Stars
Minnesota Wild
Nashville Predators
St. Louis Blues
Winnipeg Jets